City: Magazine International was a French bimonthly lifestyle magazine published in Paris from 1984 to 1991.

Notes

1984 establishments in France
1991 disestablishments in France
Bi-monthly magazines published in France
Defunct magazines published in France
French-language magazines
Lifestyle magazines
Magazines established in 1984
Magazines disestablished in 1991
Magazines published in Paris